The 1987 Jeep-Eagle Aloha Bowl was a college football bowl game, played as part of the 1987-88 bowl game schedule of the 1987 NCAA Division I-A football season. It was the sixth Aloha Bowl.  It was played on December 25, 1987, at Aloha Stadium in Honolulu, Hawaii. The game matched the Florida Gators of the Southeastern Conference against the UCLA Bruins of the Pac-10 Conference. The Bruins were led by quarterback Troy Aikman.

Scoring summary

First quarter
UCLA – Alfredo Velasco 34-yard field goal
UF – Kerwin Bell to Stacey Simmons 7-yard pass (Robert McGinty kick)

Second quarter
UF – McGinty 32-yard field goal
UCLA – Brian Brown 1-yard run (Velasco kick)

Third quarter
UCLA – Troy Aikman to Danny Thompson 5-yard pass (Velasco kick)

Fourth quarter
UCLA – Velasco 32-yard field goal
UF – Bell to Anthony Williams 14 pass (kick blocked)

Statistics

Individual Leaders
Rushing: UCLA – Ball 23-49, Brown 10-29; FLA – Smith 17-128, Williams 8-43.
Passing: UCLA – Aikman 19-30-2-173-1 TD; FLA – Bell 19-38-0-188-2 TD.
Receiving: UCLA – Anderson 4-52, Pickert 3-37; FLA – Snead 3-62, Odom 3-32, Simmons 3-20

References

Aloha Bowl
Aloha Bowl
Florida Gators football bowl games
UCLA Bruins football bowl games
December 1987 sports events in the United States
Aloha